Åsane may refer to:

Places
Åsane, a borough in the city of Bergen, Norway
Åsane (municipality), a former municipality in Hordaland county, Norway (now part of Bergen, Norway)
Åsane Storsenter, a mall in the city of Bergen, Norway
Åsane Church, a church in the city of Bergen, Norway
Old Åsane Church, an historic church in the city of Bergen, Norway
Åsane (Kristiansand), a neighborhood in the city of Kristiansand, Norway

Sports
Åsane Fotball, a Norwegian football club located in Bergen, Norway
Åsane Seahawks, an American football and cheerleading team located in Bergen, Norway